Grenzach-Wyhlen is a municipality in the district of Lörrach in Baden-Württemberg, Germany. It is situated on the right bank of the Rhine, 7 km east of Basel, and 8 km south of Lörrach. It has borders to Inzlingen and Rheinfelden (Baden) in Germany, and Riehen (BS), Birsfelden (BL) and Kaiseraugst (AG) in Switzerland.

History 
Grenzach-Wyhlen was established on January 1, 1975 from the two independent municipalities Grenzach and Wyhlen in the course of the Baden-Württemberg reform of the local governments.

First settlements in today's municipality area are of Celtic origin, belonging to the Hallstatt culture in the early 1st millennium BC. The Celtic settlement was followed by Roman settlements and from the 3rd century on by Alemannic ones. The name "Wyhlen" originates in Alemannic "ze wilon", meaning "at the farmstead".

The Roman settlement was called Carantiacum (well of Carantius). From this name today's name Grenzach emerged. In 1982 remains of a Roman villa were excavated. Later on some ruins of an outbuilding were found and archaeologically investigated too. 1991 more walls were found, which were restored and are now visible to the public.

The first documented mentioning of the settlement was in the 13th century CE, when Grenzach and Wyhlen were under Frankish rule. In the late Middle Ages the villages were separated by a national border. Grenzach came to the Margraviate of Baden, while Wyhlen belonged to Further Austria.

In the Thirty Years' War and in later military conflicts the villages suffered severe devastation. With the founding of the Grand Duchy of Baden Wyhlen also became Badisch, so that after more than 500 years the two places were again under the same territorial rule.

References

External links
 
 Grenzach-Wyhlen: History & Images

Lörrach (district)
Baden